Joe Fletcher may refer to:

Joe Fletcher (footballer) (born 1946), British footballer
Joe Fletcher (referee) (born 1976), Canadian soccer referee

See also
Jo Fletcher (born 1980), English footballer